The Hanji railway–Jiaoji railway link line is a freight railway line in Jinan, Shandong, China. It links the Handan–Jinan railway and the Qingdao–Jinan railway, bypassing central Jinan.

History 
Construction began in July 2016. The line was opened on 26 December 2019.

Design 

References 

Railway lines in China
Railway lines opened in 2019